Pot Noodle is a brand of instant noodle snack foods from United Kingdom, available in a selection of flavours and varieties. This dehydrated food consists of noodles, assorted dried vegetables and flavouring powder. It is prepared by adding boiling water, which rapidly softens the noodles and dissolves the powdered sauce.

The product is packaged in a plastic pot, from which the prepared noodles can be eaten. Many pots contain a sachet of sauce, such as soy sauce.

History
Instant noodles were originally invented in 1958 by Momofuku Ando, and Cup Noodles developed by his company Nissin Foods in 1971. Golden Wonder launched the Pot Noodle brand in the United Kingdom in 1977. In July 1995, Best Foods, which produces Hellmanns mayonnaise, paid then owner Dalgety plc $280 million for its Golden Wonder Pot Noodle instant hot snacks manufacturing business.

Bestfoods, known as CPC international before 1997, was itself acquired by Unilever in June 2000. Unilever kept the Pot Noodle brand and its sole production factory, after it sold the rest of the Golden Wonder business in January 2006 to Tayto. Golden Wonder later established another line of pot noodles called The Nation's Noodle (renamed Noodle Pot in 2016) in direct competition with their former brand.

Production

Pot Noodles are manufactured in Croespenmaen, near Crumlin, Caerphilly, Wales, which became the topic of an advertising campaign of 2006, showing fictitious Pot Noodle mines in Wales. The factory typically produces 175 million pots annually.

Around 2006, Pot Noodle's recipe was changed to make the product healthier. This mostly involved cutting down on the amount of salt in the product. A "GTi" variant, prepared in a microwave instead of adding boiling water, was introduced at the end of the 2000s and was the first Pot Noodle to contain real meat. In 2007, the brand changed their logo.

Pot Noodle has often given promotional gifts away, including a 'horn' and a 'spinning fork.' During the 2008 Edinburgh Festival Fringe, Unilever sponsored a musical directed by David Sant, and created by advertising agency Mother, set in a Pot Noodle factory.

Flavours

Currently produced flavours 
As of 27 May 2022, flavours of pot noodle currently produced are:

 King Bombay Bad Boy
 King Chow Mein
 King Chicken And Mushroom
 King Beef & Tomato
 King Original Curry
 King Sticky Rib
 Korma
 Doner Kebab
 Sweet & Sour
 Original Curry
 Chow Mein
 Beef & Tomato
 Chicken & Mushroom
 Sticky Rib
 Bombay Bad Boy
 Pulled Pork
 Piri Piri Chicken
 Lost The Pot Noodle: Cheese & Tomato
 Lost The Pot Noodle: Vegetable
 Lost The Pot Noodle: Noodle Curry
 Lost The Pot Noodle: Roast Chicken
 Lost The Pot Noodle: Sweet Chilli
 Lost The Pot Noodle: NEW Champion Chicken
 Lost The Pot Noodle: NEW Smokin' BBQ
 Lost The Pot Noodle: NEW Chip Shop Curry
 King Pot Pasta: Creamy Carbonara
 King Pot Pasta: Bolognese
 Pot Pasta: Tomatoey Mozarella
 Pot Pasta: Bolognese
 Pot Pasta: Creamy Carbonara
 Pot Noodle Fusions: Chilli Chicken
 Pot Noodle Fusions: Thai Green Curry
 Pot Noodle Fusions: Katsu Curry

Controversy
The Pot Noodle brand has been involved in a number of controversial advertising campaigns. In August 2002, a series of television adverts that described Pot Noodle as "the slag of all snacks" was withdrawn after complaints to the Independent Television Commission.

The related poster campaign, revolving around the "Hot Noodle" range with a tagline of "hurt me, you slag" was withdrawn by Unilever after the Advertising Standards Authority (ASA) upheld complaints that "the tone could be interpreted as condoning violence".

In May 2005, the Advertising Standards Authority received 620 complaints, about a series of advertisements featuring a man with a large brass horn in his trousers, with the suggestive slogan "Have you got the Pot Noodle horn?" Some of the complaints described them as "tasteless and offensive." The three advertisements had been already approved for restricted times, primarily after the 9:00pm watershed. The ASA did not uphold the complaints. While it accepted the campaign was "a little crude," they deemed it harmless and said that "the timing restriction was appropriate."

Related products

Golden Wonder introduced a similar convenience food "Pot Rice" at the beginning of the 1980s. Pot Rice was made from dehydrated rice, wheat protein, vegetables, and flavourings, sold in a plastic pot. Pot Rice was later manufactured by Unilever and Knorr when the Pot Noodle brand went through a series of acquisitions and takeovers in the 1990s.

Posh Noodle was a variation on the typical pot noodle, consisting of thinner, ramen like noodles and available in three Asian themed flavours, launched in 2003.

Pot Rice was discontinued at the beginning of the 2000s. Pot Rice flavours have included "Chicken Risotto", "Chicken Curry", "Beef & Tomato" and "Savoury Beef". Pot Rice received a limited relaunch in 2018. "Pot Mash" was a similar branded mashed potato snack, sold by the makers of Pot Noodle in the United Kingdom and Ireland at the end of the 1990s.

"Pot Casserole" consisting of dried vegetables and soya protein was introduced during the 1980s, but discontinued before the turn of the century. "Pot Pasta" and "Pot Spaghetti" combined dried pasta pieces with a sachet of Parmesan cheese, and was available for some time in the 1990s. However, in 2017, Pot Pasta was relaunched. "Pot Sweet" was a dessert range available in four varieties, introduced in the mid-1980s, and discontinued shortly afterwards.

In 2020, Lost the Pot Noodle, instant noodles in loose plastic packaging instead of a plastic pot, was launched in 3 flavours: curry, roast chicken and sweet chilli.

From August 2021, Pot Noodle launched another new range of pots, titled 'Pot Noodle Fusions'. This range hearkened back to earlier ranges like 'Posh Noodle' and 'Asian Street Style' with more exotic world food flavours including Chilli Chicken, Katsu Curry and the previously available Thai Green Curry flavours, as a partial rebrand and partial new launch.

See also

Ramen noodles
List of instant noodle brands
Indomie
Maggi noodles
Sapporo Ichiban
Shin Ramyun
Super Noodles
Wai Wai (food brand)

References

External links
 
 Unilever brand information

Products introduced in 1978
British snack foods
Food brands of the United Kingdom
Instant noodle brands
Unilever brands
Welsh brands
Food and drink companies of Wales